Khalti Lake (Urdu: خلتی جھیل, Khowar: خلتیو چھت) is situated in Gupis-Yasin District, the westernmost part of the Gilgit–Baltistan region and northernmost territory of Pakistan.  This lake is an important source of fresh water and has a stock of trout. A PTDC motel is situated nearby with a view of the lake. The water is extremely cold which flows directly from surrounding glaciers. The lake usually freezes in winter season and people can easily walk on it.

The lake is known for its habitat of trout fish. The lake is in a bend of the Ghizer River near the village of Khalti. Khalti Lake is known for its stock of trout. Originally, the trout was put into the River Ghizer near Golaghmuli Village. Those fishes increased in number and reached almost every part of Gupis Valley.

See also
Phander Lake
Handarap Lake

References

External links 
 Khalti Lake

Shandor Festival
Lakes of Gilgit-Baltistan
Reservoirs in Pakistan
Lakes in Ghizer